Abdul Wahab is a Bangladesh Nationalist Party politician. He served as the Jatiya Sangsad member representing the Jhenaidah-1 constituency.

Career
In November 2008, Anti-Corruption Commission filed a case against Wahab for allegedly hiding Tk 89 lakh in his wealth statement. In October 2017, a Jessore court  sentenced Wahab to eight years in jail for illegally accumulating that wealth.

References

Living people
Bangladesh Nationalist Party politicians
5th Jatiya Sangsad members
6th Jatiya Sangsad members
7th Jatiya Sangsad members
Place of birth missing (living people)
Date of birth missing (living people)
People from Jhenaidah District
Year of birth missing (living people)